Riksgränsen,, The National Border in Swedish, is a ski-resort in Kiruna Municipality, Lappland, Sweden, 200 km north of the Arctic Circle. The skiing season is from February to June. From end of May the lifts operate under the midnight sun. One of the pistes cross the border to Norway and back to Sweden. No border control there.

Riksgränsen is a popular location for the winter testing of pre-production cars by various European manufacturers. Photo-snipers are prevalent, attempting to get the first spy-shots of new models, though their activities are frowned upon by local hoteliers who value the custom of the manufacturers. The same manufacturers frequently use the location for winter launches, bringing journalists from across the world to drive the new cars on snow-covered roads and on courses specially prepared on frozen lakes.

History
The village was founded around 1900 in connection with the construction of the railway, whose traffic began 1902. Due to railway politics and limited range for steam locomotives, trains changed locomotives and crew and a roundhouse for locomotives was built. Later, after electrification 1923, this roundhouse was removed and locomotives went all the way to Narvik. Tourism picked up in the 1930:s. The first ski lift was built 1952.

Climate
Although the subarctic climate (Koppen: Dfc) of the region is very cold, it has considerably milder winters than normally expected for an inland northerly area, due to its proximity to the warm North Atlantic Current. Summers do remain cool in spite of the midnight sun due to similar maritime effects. With prevailing low-pressure systems taking precedence, the climate is snowy and cloudy. The deep snow cover and the time it takes for thawing prolongs the skiing season to the midnight sun window. The snow depth can be above  in unshovelled areas during spring. The snow depth charts have sometimes ended during late May when the pack has been shrinking, which skews the June readings that likely are a bit higher. In 2020  snow cover was measured in that month.

References

External links
Riksgränsen

Lapland (Sweden)
Ski areas and resorts in Sweden
Buildings and structures in Norrbotten County
Tourist attractions in Norrbotten County